La vita agra is a 1964 Italian film by director Carlo Lizzani, based on Luciano Bianciardi's novel of the same name.

In 2008 the film was selected to enter the list of the 100 Italian films to be saved.

Cast
 Ugo Tognazzi as Luciano Bianchi
 Giovanna Ralli as Anna
 Nino Krisman as The Chairman
 Giampiero Albertini as Libero
 Rossana Martini as Mara
 Elio Crovetto as Carlone
 Enzo Jannacci as The Ballad Singer
 Paola Dapino as Iolanda
 Pippo Starnazza as The Librarian
 Maria Pia Arcangeli as The Publishing House Manager
 Augusto Bonardi as The Propagandist
 Antonio Bruno as The Police Superintendent
 Pupo De Luca as Don Torneri, the Priest

Luciano Bianciardi, author of the novel, appeared in a small cameo.

References

External links

 
 

1964 films
1964 comedy films
Italian comedy films
1960s Italian-language films
Films with screenplays by Luciano Vincenzoni
Films based on Italian novels
Films set in Milan
1960s Italian films